"ASAP" is a song recorded by South Korean girl group STAYC for their second single album Staydom. It was released as the lead single on April 8, 2021, by High Up Entertainment. The song was written and composed by Black Eyed Pilseung and Jeon Goon, and arranged by Rado.

Background and release
On March 24, 2021, High Up Entertainment announced that STAYC would be releasing their second single album titled Staydom on April 8. On March 25, the promotional schedule was released. On March 27, the track listing for the single album was released with "ASAP" announced as the lead single. On April 2, a highlight medley teaser video was released. On April 6, the teaser video showing portion of the song choreography was released. On April 7, the teaser for the music video was released. The song along with the music video was released on April 8.

Composition
"ASAP" was written and composed by Black Eyed Pilseung and Jeon Goon, and arranged by Rado. Musically, the song is described by NME as "trapped between a cutesy bubblegum pop production and a sensual summer jam". "ASAP" was composed in the key of C major, with a tempo of 132 beats per minute.

Commercial performance
"ASAP" debuted at position 108 on South Korea's Gaon Digital Chart in the chart issue dated April 11–17, 2021. The song also debuted at position 35 on the Gaon Download Chart in the chart issue dated April 4–10, 2021, and at position 108 on the Gaon Streaming Chart in the chart issue dated April 11–17, 2021. The song then ascended to position 9 and 17 on the Gaon Digital Chart and Gaon Download Chart, respectively, in the chart issue dated June 6–12, 2021, and at position 8 on the Gaon Streaming Chart in the chart issue dated June 13–19, 2021. The song debuted at position 70 on Billboard K-pop Hot 100 in the chart issue dated April 24, 2021. The song then ascended to position 9 in the chart issue dated May 29, 2021.

Promotion
Prior to the single album's release, on April 8, 2021, STAYC held a live event called "STAYC (스테이씨) The 2nd Single Album [STAYDOM] Showcase" on V Live to introduce the single album and its song including "ASAP". Following the release of the single album, the group performed "ASAP" on five music programs: KBS2's Music Bank on every Thursday from April 9 to April 30, SBS's Inkigayo on every Sunday from April 11 to May 2, SBS MTV's The Show on April 13 and 20, MBC's Show! Music Core on April 17 and May 1, and MBC M's Show Champion on April 21.

Credits and personnel
Credits adapted from Melon.

Studio
 Ingrid Studio – recording, digital editing
 Koko Sound Studio – mixing
 Metropolis Mastering Studios – mastering

Personnel

 STAYC – vocals, background vocals
 Black Eyed Pilseung – lyrics, composition
 Jeon Goon – lyrics, composition
 Rado – arrangement, bass, keyboard
 Jung Eun-kyung – recording, digital editing
 Kim Su-jeong – recording
 Go Hyeon-jeong – mixing
 Kim Jun–sang – mixing (assistant)
 Jung Gi-un – mixing (assistant)
 Im Min-woo – mixing (assistant)
 Stuart Hawkes – mastering

Accolades

Awards and nominations

Listicles

Charts

Weekly charts

Monthly charts

Year-end charts

Release history

References

2021 songs
2021 singles
STAYC songs
Song recordings produced by Black Eyed Pilseung